The Birkenhead Point Outlet Centre is an outlet centre located in Drummoyne, New South Wales, Australia. As well as including a large number of shops, the centre also includes a marina and apartment complex.

History
Prior to being redeveloped as a shopping centre, the site was the site of the Perdriau Rubber Factory. Henry Perdriau started manufacturing rubber products here in c.1900. Perdriau Rubber Co. merged with the Dunlop Rubber Company of Australia in 1928, by which time Perdriau was producing 50,000 shoes per week and between 500,000 - 780,000 tyres annually. The rubber factory was closed in 1976 when the site was sold to David Jones to be redeveloped. The centre was opened on Thursday 26 July 1979 when redevelopment works were 80% complete.

References

External links

Birkenhead Point on Google +

Shopping centres in Sydney
Shopping malls established in 1979
1979 establishments in Australia